Derby Rafael Carrillo Berduo (born September 19, 1987) is a Salvadoran professional goalkeeper who plays for Cobán Imperial in Guatemala.

Early life
Carrillo was born in La Mirada, California and attended St. John Bosco High School. He began playing college soccer at California State University, Dominguez Hills, where he posted a 13-3-1 record in two seasons with the Toros after redshirting as a freshman. He was named a Daktronics first team All-American, a first team All-Region selection, a first team CCAA selection, and an NCAA Far West All-Tournament Team selection in 2007. Before his junior year, he transferred to St. John's University. At St. John's he played two years, as a backup on the Red Storm's College Cup squad in 2008 and starting all 21 games during the 2009 season, going 9-3-9.

While in college, Carrillo played in the USL Premier Development League for the Newark Ironbound Express.

Professional career
Carrillo attended Major League Soccer's (MLS) 2010 Arizona training camp with Seattle Sounders FC. He made an impression on the coaching staff, and was asked to accompany the team to their Spain preseason camp. After the training camp, the coaching staff asked Carrillo to return to Seattle with them to train for the 2010 season and play games with Kitsap Pumas, a local P.D.L. team. Carrillo trained with the Sounders, and signed and played with the Pumas.

In 2011, Carrillo signed with F.C. New York of the USL Professional Division, and made his debut on April 9, 2011 in New York's first-ever game, which was a 3–0 loss to Orlando City.

Eric Wynalda chose Carrillo to be part of the Cal Football Club in 2012, where they competed in the 2012 Lamar Hunt U.S. Open Cup and pulled off an upset by beating MLS' Portland Timbers. Carrillo later signed to play for Santa Tecla before the 2012 Apertura. He has also trained in camps with El Salvador youth teams.

On March 26, 2014, he signed with Atlanta Silverbacks of the NASL.

Honours

Club
Santa Tecla
Salvadoran Primera División (2): Clausura 2015 Apertura 2018

ÍBV
Icelandic Cup (1): 2017

References

External links
 St. John's Bio
 
 

1987 births
Living people
American soccer players
American sportspeople of Salvadoran descent
Citizens of El Salvador through descent
Salvadoran footballers
Salvadoran expatriate footballers
El Salvador international footballers
Cal State Dominguez Hills Toros men's soccer players
St. John's Red Storm men's soccer players
Jersey Express S.C. players
Kitsap Pumas players
F.C. New York players
Cal FC players
Santa Tecla F.C. footballers
Cobán Imperial players
Atlanta Silverbacks players
Íþróttabandalag Vestmannaeyja players
USL League Two players
North American Soccer League players
Liga Nacional de Fútbol de Guatemala players
Soccer players from California
2013 Copa Centroamericana players
2013 CONCACAF Gold Cup players
2014 Copa Centroamericana players
2015 CONCACAF Gold Cup players
2017 CONCACAF Gold Cup players
Association football goalkeepers
People from La Mirada, California
Expatriate footballers in Iceland
Expatriate footballers in Guatemala